The following article presents a summary of the 2010 football (soccer) season in Brazil, which was the 109th season of competitive football in the country.

Campeonato Brasileiro Série A 

The 2010 Campeonato Brasileiro Série A started on May 8, 2010, and concluded on December 5, 2010.

Fluminense declared as the Campeonato Brasileiro Série A champions.

Relegation 
The four worst placed teams, which are Vitória, Guarani, Goiás and Prudente, were relegated to the following year's second level.

Campeonato Brasileiro Série B 

The 2010 Campeonato Brasileiro Série B started on May 7, 2010, concluded on November 27, 2010.

Coritiba declared as the Campeonato Brasileiro Série B champions.

Promotion 
The four best placed teams, which are Coritiba, Figueirense, Bahia and América-MG, were promoted to the following year's first level.

Relegation 
The four worst placed teams, which are Brasiliense, Santo André, Ipatinga and América-RN, were relegated to the following year's third level.

Campeonato Brasileiro Série C 

The 2010 Campeonato Brasileiro Série C started on July 18, 2010, and concluded on November 21, 2010. The Campeonato Brasileiro Série C final was played between ABC and Ituiutaba.

ABC declared as the league champions by aggregate score of 1–0.

Participating teams 

 ABC
 Águia de Marabá
 Alecrim
 Brasil
 Campinense
 Caxias
 Chapecoense
 CRB
 Criciúma
 Fortaleza
 Gama
 Ituiutaba
 Juventude
 Luverdense
 Macaé
 Marília
 Paysandu
 Rio Branco-AC
 Salgueiro
 São Raimundo

Promotion 
The four best placed teams, which are ABC, Ituiutaba, Criciúma and Salgueiro, were promoted to the following year's second level.

Relegation 
The four worst placed teams, which are Alecrim, Juventude, Gama and São Raimundo (PA), were relegated to the following year's fourth level.

Campeonato Brasileiro Série D 

The 2010 Campeonato Brasileiro Série D started on July 18, 2010, and concluded on November 14, 2010. The Campeonato Brasileiro Série D final was played between Guarany de Sobral and América (AM).

Guarany de Sobral declared as the league champions by aggregate score of 5–2.

Promotion 
The four best placed teams, which are Guarany de Sobral, Madureira, Joinville and Araguaína, were promoted to the following year's third level. On December 9, 2010 the STJD punished América (AM) with the loss of six points due to fielding an out-of-contract player. América (AM) then lost its promotion, which was awarded to Joinville.

Copa do Brasil 

The 2010 Copa do Brasil started on February 10, 2010, and ended on August 4, 2010. The Copa do Brasil final was played between Santos and Vitória.

Santos declared as the cup champions on better goal difference by aggregate score of 3–2.

State championship champions

Youth competition champions 

(1) The Copa Nacional do Espírito Santo Sub-17, between 2008 and 2012, was named Copa Brasil Sub-17. The similar named Copa do Brasil Sub-17 is organized by the Brazilian Football Confederation and it was first played in 2013.

Other competition champions

Brazilian clubs in international competitions

Brazil national team 
The following table lists all the games played by the Brazil national team in official competitions and friendly matches during 2010.

Women's football

National team 
The following table lists all the games played by the Brazil women's national football team in official competitions and friendly matches during 2010.

The Brazil women's national football team competed in the following competitions in 2010:

Copa do Brasil de Futebol Feminino 

The 2010 Copa do Brasil de Futebol Feminino started on August 16, 2010, and concluded on December 4, 2010.

Duque de Caxias/CEPE declared as the cup champions by aggregate score of 2–2.

Domestic competition champions

Brazilian clubs in international competitions

References

External links 
 Brazilian competitions at RSSSF
 2010 Brazil national team matches at RSSSF

 
Seasons in Brazilian football
Brazil